Earl of Carnarvon is a title that has been created three times in British history. The current holder is George Herbert, 8th Earl of Carnarvon. The town and county in Wales to which the title refers are historically spelled Caernarfon, having been Anglicised to Carnarvon or Caernarvon. The traditional Welsh spelling is itself a modified form of the original name of antiquity, Caer-yn-Arfon, meaning fortification opposite the island of Mona (now called Môn, Anglesey in English).

History
The first creation came in the Peerage of England in 1628 in favour of Robert Dormer, 2nd Baron Dormer of Wyng. For more information on this creation, which became extinct in 1709, see the Baron Dormer.

The second creation was in 1714 in the Peerage of Great Britain for James Brydges, 9th Baron Chandos. In 1719 he was further honoured when he was made Marquess of Carnarvon and Duke of Chandos. For more information on this creation, which became extinct in 1789, see the Duke of Chandos.

The third creation was in 1793 in the Peerage of Great Britain for Henry Herbert, 1st Baron Porchester. The precise form of this creation was Earl of the Town and County of Carnarvon, in the Principality of Wales, although in practice only the style of Earl of Carnarvon is used. He had previously represented Wilton in the House of Commons and had already in 1780 been created Baron Porchester, of High Clere in the County of Southampton (also in the Peerage of Great Britain). Herbert was the son of Major-General the Hon. William Herbert, fifth son of Thomas Herbert, 8th Earl of Pembroke. He was succeeded by his eldest son Henry George Herbert, the second Earl, who sat as Whig Member of Parliament for Cricklade.

His eldest son Henry John George Herbert, the third Earl, briefly represented Wootton Bassett in Parliament as a Tory before he succeeded his father in the earldom. His eldest son Henry Howard Molyneux Herbert, the fourth Earl, was a prominent Conservative politician and served as Secretary of State for the Colonies and as Lord Lieutenant of Ireland. He was succeeded by his only son from his first marriage, George Herbert, 5th Earl of Carnarvon, who is noted for discovering the tomb of Tutankhamun along with Howard Carter.

, the titles are held by the fifth earl's great-grandson, the eighth Earl, who succeeded in 2001. As a male line descendant of Thomas Herbert, 8th Earl of Pembroke and 5th Earl of Montgomery, he is also in remainder to these peerages and their subsidiary titles.

Several other members of this branch of the Herbert family may be mentioned. The Very Reverend the Hon. William Herbert, third son of the first Earl, was a clergyman and noted botanist. His son Henry William Herbert was a novelist and writer on sport. Sir Robert George Wyndham Herbert, Permanent Under-Secretary of State for the Colonies from 1871 to 1892, was the son of the Hon. Algernon Herbert, fifth son of the first Earl.

The Hon. Auberon Herbert, second son of the third Earl, was a writer, theorist, and philosopher, and also represented Nottingham in the House of Commons. He married Lady Florence Amabel Cowper, daughter of George Cowper, 6th Earl Cowper and his wife Lady Anne Florence de Grey Cowper, 7th Baroness Lucas of Crudwell. In 1905, their only son Auberon Herbert succeeded his uncle as ninth Baron Lucas of Crudwell (see this title for further history of this branch of the family).

The Hon. Aubrey Herbert, second son of the fourth Earl, was Member of Parliament for South Somerset and for Yeovil. His son Auberon Herbert was an expert on Eastern Europe. His daughter Laura Herbert was the second wife of the novelist Evelyn Waugh and mother of the journalist Auberon Waugh.

The family seat of the Herbert Earls of Carnarvon is Highclere Castle in Hampshire, which was the filming location for the UK television series Downton Abbey. The traditional burial place of the Herbert Earls of Carnarvon is the Carnarvon Mausoleum, located in the park at Highclere Castle; some other family members are buried in the Herbert Mausoleum at the Church of All Saints, Burghclere.

Earls of Carnarvon, first creation (1628)

see the Baron Dormer

Earls of Carnarvon, second creation (1714)
see the Duke of Chandos

Barons Porchester (1780)
Henry Herbert, 1st Baron Porchester (1741–1811), was created Earl of Carnarvon in 1793

Earls of Carnarvon, third creation (1793)

Henry Herbert, 1st Earl of Carnarvon (1741–1811)
Henry George Herbert, 2nd Earl of Carnarvon (1772–1833)
Henry John George Herbert, 3rd Earl of Carnarvon (1800–1849)
Henry Howard Molyneux Herbert, 4th Earl of Carnarvon (1831–1890)
George Edward Stanhope Molyneux Herbert, 5th Earl of Carnarvon (1866–1923), bankroller of the discovery of Tutankhamun's tomb.
Henry George Alfred Marius Victor Francis Herbert, 6th Earl of Carnarvon (1898–1987)
Henry George Reginald Molyneux Herbert, 7th Earl of Carnarvon (1924–2001)
George Reginald Oliver Molyneux Herbert, 8th Earl of Carnarvon (born 1956)

, the heir apparent is the present holder's elder son, George Kenneth Oliver Molyneux Herbert, Lord Porchester (born 1992).
Until the birth of Reginald Henry Michael, Lord Herbert, to William Herbert, 18th Earl of Pembroke, on 21 October 2012, the 8th Earl of Carnarvon was the heir presumptive to the earldom of Pembroke and the earldom of Montgomery. The 8th Earl is third-in-line to those titles.

See also
Earl of Pembroke
Baron Lucas of Crudwell

References

Attribution

External links

Highclere Castle

 
Extinct earldoms in the Peerage of England
Earldoms in the Peerage of Great Britain
Extinct earldoms in the Peerage of Great Britain
Noble titles created in 1628
Noble titles created in 1714
Noble titles created in 1793